Joshua Alexandre Bergasse (born March 6, 1973) is an American choreographer and dancer.  He has won a Primetime Emmy Award for Outstanding Choreography for his work on the TV show, Smash.  He has choreographed a number of Broadway and Off-Broadway musicals such as Charlie and the Chocolate Factory, the 2014 revival of On the Town, and the Off-Broadway revival of Rodgers and Hart’s I Married an Angel.

Early life
Joshua Bergasse was born on March 6, 1973, and grew up in Farmington Hills, Michigan. He attended his mother's dance studio, Annette and Company School of Dance, during his childhood.  Around age 15–16, Bergasse started teaching at his mother's studio and his passion ignited.  His choreographic inspirations came from the movie musicals he used to watch.  His idols included Bob Fosse, Gene Kelly, Fred Astaire, Hermes Pan, and Michael Kidd.  He notes that these influences are important to the development of his choreographic style.

Career
At age 22, Bergasse went to an audition for the national tour of West Side Story during a vacation to New York City to see shows and take classes.  He was offered the role of Baby John and was a member of the tour for two years.  After the tour ended, he stayed in New York to continue working as a dancer.  Bergasse started to choreograph more and more in New York until he became known as a choreographer.

In 2012, Bergasse became a choreographer for the TV show, Smash for its two-season run.  He got the job offer after the director, Michael Mayer, saw some of Bergasse's work at a New York University benefit and asked for his reel.  They originally met during the out of town tryout of Thoroughly Modern Millie.  Meyer was the director of the production and Bergasse was a dance captain.  They reconnected through Smash.  Bergasse was responsible for the choreography of the big dance numbers in the show.  This also included any type of dancing in the background of shots.  During the filming of the second season, Bergasse was able to choreograph for both of the hypothetical musicals: Bombshell and Hit List.  He starts the choreography process for each dance number immediately after the composers finish the song.  He will first set the piece on stand-ins for the leads, and then he will teach it to the principals after the executive producers approve the number.  The amount of prep time available to get the dance numbers ready ranged from two days to a week.  In 2012, Bergasse won a Primetime Emmy Award for Outstanding Choreography for his work on Smash.

In 2014, Bergasse choreographed the Broadway revival of On the Town.  He found working on the musical incredibly enjoyable because dance is used as a major form of storytelling in this specific piece.  His work on On the Town earned him an Astaire Award and a Tony Award Nomination for Best Choreography.

Bergasse has choreographed the Broadway revival of Gigi in 2015 as well as the Off-Broadway productions of Sweet Charity, Bomb-Itty of Errors, Captain Louie, and Cagney.  He earned a Drama Desk, an Astaire, and an Outer Critics Circle Award nomination for his choreography in Cagney.  His other choreographic credits include West Side Story at the Stratford Festival, Little Me at City Center Encores!, 'It's a Bird... It's a Plane... It's Superman' at City Center Encores!, Pirates of Penzance at Barrington Stage Co., Guys and Dolls at Carnegie Hall, and The Sound of Music at Carnegie Hall.

Bergasse choreographed the Broadway musical Charlie and the Chocolate Factory in 2017.  He spent over a year working on ‘Charlie’ before rehearsals began.  Once the dancers were in the room, he had six weeks in the studio to set his choreography on them.  He encouraged his dancers to contribute to the piece, so it feels like their own as well as his work.  Bergasse used different dance styles for different characters.  For Veruca Salt, she had a ballet number involved pointe shoes.  He choreographed a pas de deux where the partners couldn't touch each other for Charlie's mother and her deceased husband.  He even choreographed a dance number for the bed-ridden grandfather.

In 2019, Bergasse directed and choreographed a revival of the Rodgers and Hart musical I Married an Angel for the New York City Encores! series. This production starred his wife, Sara Mearns.  Bergasse and Mearns were approached to take on this project by Jack Viertel.  This is because of the history of George Balanchine choreographing this specific musical with his then significant other, Vera Zorina, as the leading lady.  It was thought to be a cute parallel for the pair to revive this musical around eighty years later.  The musical contained a significant amount of dancing, including two ten-minute ballet sequences to choreograph.

Personal life
In November 2012, Joshua Bergasse met Sara Mearns when she was auditioning for a featured dancing role on Smash.  The dance number she was being considered for was inevitably cut, but Bergasse and Mearns hit it off and started dating a few months later.  After five years of dating, they got engaged on Valentine's Day.  They were married on November 3, 2018, in Sunset Beach, North Carolina.  Because Mearns is also a dancer, they collaborate on each other's projects.  They have also worked on projects together since their marriage such as Rodgers and Hart's I Married an Angel and a dance piece starring Mearns at the Fire Island Dance Festival.

References 

Living people
1973 births
American dancers
American choreographers